Robert Bitmead may refer to:
Bob Bitmead (born 1942), Australian cricketer
Robert R. Bitmead, American engineer